The Hawaiians, released in the UK as Master of the Islands, is a 1970 United States historical film based on the 1959 novel Hawaii by James A. Michener. It was directed by Tom Gries with a screenplay by James R. Webb. The cast included Charlton Heston as Whipple Hoxworth and Geraldine Chaplin. The performance by Tina Chen led to her receiving a Golden Globe nomination as best supporting actress.

The film was based on the book's later chapters, which covered the arrival of the Chinese and Japanese and the growth of the plantations. The third chapter of the book had been made into the film Hawaii in 1966.

Plot
Forty years after the events in the film Hawaii, Sea Captain Whipple "Whip" Hoxworth returns with a full hold of Chinese laborers to learn that his grandfather (Captain Rafer Hoxworth) has died and left his fortune to Hoxworth's cousin, Malama, and her husband, Micah Hale. Whip, considered the black sheep of his devout and conservative family, receives the worthless, waterless Hanakai plantation

The story also follows two Chinese from Whip's ship, Mun Ki and Bong Nyuk Tsin. When Bong Nyuk Tsin is discovered in among the male Chinese immigrants, Mun Ki claims that she is his wife to protect her from rape. The man who kidnapped Bong Nyuk Tsin from her Hakka village and sold her to a Honolulu brothel is killed during the voyage. At the dock, Mun Ki and the brothel owner argue over Bong Nyuk Tsin. Whip's wife, Purity, intervenes and makes him accept Bong Nyuk Tsin as Mun Ki's wife and hire both. The couple are provided a wood shack on the plantation to live in.

Mun Ki takes the pregnant Bong Nyuk Tsin to the merchant Foo Sen, a wise man, astrologer and genealogist. Mun Ki's horoscope foretells many sons to be named after the continents. The first-born will be Kee Ah Chow, Asia. Foo Sen explains to Bong Nyuk Tsin that when her child is born, Mun Ki's first wife in China will be considered the “real” mother of all his anticipated sons, and will be called Mother of Wu Chow, Mother of Five Continents. Bong Nyuk Tsin will be “Aunt of Wu Chow,” (familiarly called "Wu Chow's Auntie"), Aunt of Five Continents. One day, Mun Ki will return to China, taking his sons to their "real" mother.

The boy is born, and, soon after, Purity also gives birth to a son, Noel. Purity has no milk, and Whip asks Wu Chow's Auntie to nurse the child. He notices her garden and learns she plans to save money to buy land by selling the produce. She declares never to return to China.

A well-driller named Overpeck drills through caprock on Whip's land and releases water trapped between layers of ancient lava, creating the first artesian well in Hawaii.

Purity, like Whip, is one-quarter Hawaiian. She becomes obsessed with their native ancestry and rebuffs Whip's affections. The doctor believes Purity suffers from post-natal depression, but says her mental decline could also be from generations of inbreeding by her royal Hawaiian ancestors.

Whip's relatives refuse to finance him farming sugar cane, saying it will fail. He then has two seed pineapple plants smuggled out of French Guiana. He gives the nearly-dead specimens to Wu Chow's Auntie. The plants flourish under her care. Whip, ecstatic, buys her some land in gratitude, then returns to French Guiana to steal more pineapples.

While Whip is away, Wu Chow’s Auntie and Mun Ki discover that he has leprosy. Whip returns to find that Mun Ki is about to be banished to the leper colony on Molokai. Wu Chow's Auntie insists on going with him, leaving her sons behind.

Whip fetches his son Noel from Purity, who now lives among Hawaiian natives and refuses to return home. Whip then goes to Molokai to retrieve Mun Ki and Wu Chow's Auntie's infant daughter. At Wu Chow Auntie's request, Foo Sen names the baby girl, Mei Lei. Years pass. Teen-aged Noel goes to sea. Japanese arrive to work in the pineapple fields. Whip meets a beautiful, well-educated Japanese girl named Fumiko, who becomes his mistress.

Mun Ki dies. With Whip's help, Wu Chow's Auntie is reunited with her grown, educated, and prospering sons and young daughter. She sends one son to America to study law.

The United States annexes Hawaii. When Noel and Mei Lei fall in love, Whip and Wu Chow's Auntie are against their marrying, although her sons approve. She says that white people do not understand the value of building a large family that expands exponentially through generations. This is Mun Ki's immortality.

Plague comes to Honolulu. Fires set to burn out vermin rage out of control. Amid the ashes, Whip and Wu Chow's Auntie agree that Mei Lei and Noel can marry, and Whip will lend Wu Chow's Auntie the money to rebuild.

The film ends with Wu Chow's Auntie sitting next to Mun Ki's grave, telling him about their family.

Cast

Reception
The film opened to mixed reviews, with many critics feeling it was not as successful as the earlier movie Hawaii (1966), which was liked by both moviegoers and critics. It earned less money than the original film.

Writing for The New York Times, Roger Greenspun called it a "movie with reasonable claims to having something for almost everybody", with "spectacle" that proceeds with "efficient and attractive modesty"; he complimented the director's craftsmanship and highlighted the performances of John Phillip Law and Charlton Heston, but said "Geraldine Chaplin offers only a disturbing evocation of her father's face, without the other qualities of his presence." He calls Tina Chen "not remarkable", even though she has a "role almost equal to Heston's".

Time magazine was even less complimentary, saying "the plot is laced with the usual colonial tensions and pretensions: Hoxworth feuds with a polyglut of races while his pineapple princess (Geraldine Chaplin) goes quietly mad. Every time the pace slackens, which is often, someone goes to sea, either to pick up field hands or to transport lepers to Molokai. The incessant ebb and flow is intended as a metaphor for the turbulent tides of Hawaiian life. But the real metaphor here is the pineapple, which in the good old gangster days was a synonym for bomb.

Tina Chen received a Golden Globe nomination for Best Supporting Actress. Bill Thomas was nominated for an Academy Award for Best Costume Design.

Home media
The Hawaiians was released on a home video format (DVD) on January 28, 2011 as part of the MGM Limited Edition Collection series.

See also
 List of American films of 1970

References

External links
 
 
 
 The Hawaiians, video on demand from Hulu

1970 films
1970s English-language films
1970 drama films
American drama films
Films based on American novels
Films directed by Tom Gries
United Artists films
Films produced by Walter Mirisch
Films scored by Henry Mancini
Films set in Hawaii
Films set in the 19th century
Films based on works by James A. Michener
1970s American films